The Croton Falls Reservoir is a reservoir in the New York City water supply system in the Putnam County, New York  townships of Carmel, and Southeast, roughly  north of New York City.  Part of the system's Croton Watershed, it was formed by impounding the West Branch and Middle Branch of the Croton River, tributaries of the Croton River, which flows into the Hudson River.

Placed into service in 1911, the resulting reservoir has a drainage basin of 16 square miles (25.6 km²) and can hold  of water at full capacity. This includes all bodies of water that flow into the reservoir except for other reservoirs. Water sources in the basin include Michaels Brook, and Lake Gilead, one of three controlled lakes in the Croton Watershed. The reservoir is split into three portions by Putnam County Routes 35 and 38, which cross it with causeways and bridges.

Water from the reservoir flows into Westchester County, New York, through the Muscoot Reservoir and New Croton Reservoir before entering the New Croton Aqueduct. Water in the Aqueduct flows through The Bronx into the Jerome Park Reservoir.

In January 2007, the New York City Department of Environmental Protection reportedly began a $74 million project of improvements to the Croton Falls Reservoir and the Diverting Reservoir. The upgrading and rehabilitation is part of the city's effort to comply with state and federal dam safety regulations. At the Croton Falls Reservoir, the spillway - the structure that allows excess water to leave the reservoir - will be widened and deepened. The nearly  earthen and masonry dam will be resurfaced, a new bridge will be built over the redone spillway and various mechanical items, such as valves, will be replaced. In addition, cables anchoring the dam and spillway to the bedrock will be installed. The work will require the reservoir to be deepened . The connecting channel between the two reservoirs will be emptied, inspected and dredged. Construction at both sites is expected to continue until Jan. 31, 2010.

See also

List of reservoirs and dams in New York

References

External links
 NYCDEP Water Supply Watersheds-Links to information on reservoirs by system

Croton Watershed
Reservoirs in New York (state)
Protected areas of Putnam County, New York
Reservoirs in Putnam County, New York